Belgium was represented by Sandra Kim with the song "J'aime la vie" at the Eurovision Song Contest 1986, held in Bergen, Norway.

For 1986 (like in other even-numbered years), the Walloon broadcaster in Belgium, Radio télévision belge de la communauté française (RTBF), took responsibility for Eurovision song selection. As a result, all of the competing songs for 1986 were sung in French.

Before Eurovision

Eurovision '86 
The Belgian national final to select their entry, Eurovision '86, was held on 2 March at the RTBF-TV Studios in Brussels, and was hosted by Patrick Duhamel. The winning song was decided by the following formula: 50% of the final tabulation would come from 12 "music experts" and 50% would come from 500 random Belgians polled to make up a fair segment of the Belgian population. The winning entry was "J'aime la vie", performed by Sandra Kim, composed by Jean-Paul Furnémont and Angelo Crisci, with lyrics written by Rosario Marino Atria.

At Eurovision
Sandra Kim performed thirteenth on the night of the Contest, following Ireland and preceding Germany. At the close of the voting the song had received 176 points, placing 1st in a field of 20 competing countries. It was the first win for Belgium in the Contest, something they have not been able to replicate since.

Belgium scored an absolute record at the time, with Sandra Kim earning a never seen before number of 176 points (that record remained until 1993, with Ireland scoring 187 points), an average of 9.26 points per voting nation. Kim received 77.2% of the maximum possible score, which, as of 2016, still ranks 8th among all Eurovision winners.

Voting

References

External links
Belgian National Final 1986

1986
Countries in the Eurovision Song Contest 1986
Eurovision